Kennedia rubicunda, commonly known as the dusky coral pea, is a species of flowering plant in the family Fabaceae and is endemic to eastern continental Australia. It is a twining or prostrate herb with trifoliate leaves and dark red or purple flowers.

Description 

Taxonomy 
Dusky coral pea was first formally described in 1793 by Dutch botanist George Voorhelm Schneevoogt, who gave it the name Glycine rubicunda in his book Icones Plantarum rariorum. In 1804 it was published under its current name by French botanist Étienne Pierre Ventenat in his book, Jardin de la Malmaison. The specific epithet (rubicunda) refers to the species' red flowers.

Distribution and habitat
Kennedia rubicunda is widespread in a variety of habitats, including in forests and rainforest margins, on the coast and nearby tablelands of Queensland, New South Wales and far eastern Victoria. It is an introduced species in India, Tasmania and the North Island of New Zealand (where it is considered a weed).

Ecology 
Flowers of K. rubicunda are pollinated by birds. Seed dispersal by ants (myrmecochory) has been reported, in which ants are attracted to fatty acid-rich elaiosomes attached to the outside of the seeds. The plant is killed by bushfire but regenerates from seed dormant in the soil and is often abundant after fire. K. rubicunda forms a symbiosis with soil nitrogen fixing bacteria (rhizobia) resulting in the formation of nodules on the roots that fix atmospheric nitrogen which is used for plant growth.

Use in horticulture
This plant is noted for its vigour and can be used to cover embankments or structures. 
The species is adapted to a range of well-drained soils and adapts to positions with sun or partial shade. It is resistant to drought and has some frost tolerance. The species can be propagated by scarified seed or cuttings of semi-mature growth.

References

rubicunda
Fabales of Australia
Flora of New South Wales
Flora of Queensland
Flora of Victoria (Australia)
Garden plants
Plants described in 1804